Wilhelm August Thams (June 22, 1812 – July 4, 1884) was a Norwegian merchant, land owner and lumber mill owner.

Biography
Wilhelm Thams was the son of Jacob Thullin Thams (1770–1826), who was a bailiff in Ringerike. He was married to Ida Olava Mandskow (1812-1889) and was the father of Marentius Thams (1836-1907) and grandfather of Christian Thams (1867-1948). 

In 1859, he relocated from Fredrikstad  in Østfold where he had sawmill operations and settled in Trondheim. In 1867, Wilhelm Thams built a sawmill and established a small port which became known as Thamshavn on a side inlet of Trondheimsfjord. Thams built a large company and  bought forested properties  within  the valley of  Orkdalen in Sør-Trøndelag. He established a timber trading company, Strandheim Brug,  which his son Marentius would develop  to become the largest such company in Norway. In 1868, in cooperation with ship owner Christian Salvesen, he established the Ørkedals Mining Company to develop mining interest in the area  around Løkken in Meldal.

References

Other sources
 Støren, R. (1954) Løkken Verk 1654–1904  (Orkla Grube-Aktiebolag. pp. 131–132)

Related Reading
 Strandheim Brug

1812 births
1884 deaths
People from Fredrikstad
19th-century Norwegian businesspeople
Norwegian company founders
Norwegian landowners
Norwegian merchants